Sisante Wind Farm is a 196 megawatt wind power station located in Sisante, province of Cuenca, Spain.

See also

 Wind power in Spain

Wind farms in Spain
Energy in Castilla–La Mancha